Medal for Bravery (known as "Women's Medal") founded on 14 November 1912 by King Peter I, was granted to soldiers for acts of great personal courage, or for personal courage demonstrated on the battlefield during the First Balkan War against the Ottoman Empire. The medal is awarded in two degrees (Gold and Silver). The gold medal is worn on a red bar, while the Silver appears on a tricolor ribbon (red-blue-white, of equal width).

Design
Đorđe Jovanović designed the original medal, which was later redesigned. The reason for replacement was that the original's obverse side represented Serbia with an allegorical female figure, which some officers felt diminished the award. The new model was adopted on 12 July 1913. The new medal's obverse depicted a Serbian medieval knight Miloš Obilić. Today, the original "Women's medal" is in demand by collectors worldwide,  because it is very rare and it had a specific destiny. The "Women's Medal" is now especially important in feminist organizations.

See also
Medal for Bravery (Serbia)

References

External links
 THE BRAVERY MEDAL  (1912), The Official website of the Serbian Monarchy

White Eagle, Order of the
Awards established in 1912
Awards disestablished in 1913
1912 establishments in Serbia
1913 disestablishments in Serbia
First Balkan War